Jalen Montez Duren (born November 18, 2003) is an American professional basketball player for the Detroit Pistons of the National Basketball Association (NBA). He played college basketball for the Memphis Tigers. A center, he stands  and weighs . He was a consensus five-star recruit and one of the top players in the 2021 class. Duren was ranked as the top player in the 2022 class before reclassifying.

Early life
Hailing from Sharon Hill, Pennsylvania, Duren grew up playing football and baseball in addition to basketball, which he ended up focusing on as he grew older and improved his skills. Strong showings at the MADE Hoops Middle School Academy and the CP3 Rising Stars Camp that summer solidified his position as one of the top players in his class.

High school career
Duren committed to playing high school basketball at Roman Catholic High School in Philadelphia, Pennsylvania along with AAU teammate and highly-ranked guard Justice Williams. He averaged 12.8 points, 9.3 rebounds and 2.5 blocks per game while shooting 71 percent from the field as a freshman, leading his team to their second consecutive Philadelphia Catholic League title. He earned first-team all-league and second-team all-state honors, and was named a MaxPreps Freshman All-American. That summer he was a standout performer at the 2019 Nike Elite 100 Camp.

Duren averaged 18.1 points, 12.5 rebounds and 3.4 blocks per contest during his second year, leading his team to an 18–10 record. In the first round of the Catholic League playoffs he recorded 18 points and 18 rebounds against Bonner-Prendergast, hitting the game-winning buzzer beater in the 61–59 victory on Valentine's Day. He added 20 points and 18 rebounds in their 83–73 semi-final win over regular season champions Archbishop Wood at the Palestra. They were unable to defend their league crown, though, as they were defeated by Neumann Goretti in the title game; Duren contributed 11 points and 16 rebounds in the 66–58 loss. In the first round of the PIAA class 6A playoffs, they defeated Coatesville 81–75 with Duren posting 13 points and eight rebounds. He recorded 20 points, six rebounds and eight blocks in their 62–51 quarter-final win over Pennridge before play was canceled due to the COVID-19 pandemic. At the end of the year he collected first-team all-league, first-team all-state and MaxPreps Sophomore All-American honors.

For his junior year Duren transferred to Montverde Academy in Montverde, Florida, who was in the process of joining the independent National Interscholastic Basketball Conference (NIBC) with other elite programs like Oak Hill, Wasatch Academy and Sunrise Christian amidst the COVID-19 pandemic. Duren was one of only five underclassmen named to the Sports Illustrated Preseason All-American team. In January 2021, Duren had a strong showing competing against high-level talent at the St. James NIBC Invitational in Washington, D.C., including a SportsCenter Top 10 play against Wasatch Academy where he blocked a shot by catching the ball in mid-air. On March 11, Montverde avenged their only loss of the season by defeating Sunrise Christian 61–57 for the inaugural NIBC championship; Duren finished with 13 points and seven rebounds. He averaged 15.5 points, 10.6 rebounds and 2.4 blocks per game in NIBC conference play, leading the Eagles to a 12–1 league record (20–1 overall). He was also recognized as the 2020–21 MaxPreps Florida High School Basketball Player of the Year.

Recruiting
Duren overtook Emoni Bates in his junior year as the top prospect in the 2022 recruiting class, surpassing Bates as the number one recruit according to ESPN, 247Sports and Rivals. On August 6, 2021, he reclassified to the 2021 class and committed to playing college basketball for Memphis over offers from Kentucky, Miami (Florida), the NBA G League and the Australia NBL.

College career
On November 19, 2021, Duren scored 19 points, grabbed 19 rebounds and blocked five shots in a 74–62 win against Western Kentucky. He was named to the First Team All-AAC as well as AAC Freshman of the Year. Duren lead Memphis to their first NCAA tournament appearance since 2014 leading the Tigers to the round of 32. As a freshman, he averaged 12 points, 8.1 rebounds and 2.1 blocks per game. On April 18, 2022, Duren declared for the 2022 NBA draft, forgoing his remaining college eligibility.

Professional career

Detroit Pistons (2022–present)
Duren was selected with the 13th overall pick by the Charlotte Hornets in the 2022 NBA draft. On draft day, his rights were traded to the New York Knicks and then to the Detroit Pistons. Duren joined the Pistons' 2022 NBA Summer League roster. In his summer league debut, Duren scored nine points in an 81–78 win against the Portland Trail Blazers. On July 7, 2022, Duren signed a rookie-scale contract with the Pistons. On October 19, Duren made his regular season debut, putting up 14 points, 10 rebounds, and three blocks in a 113–109 win over the Orlando Magic.

On February 10, 2023, Duren put up a double-double with a career-high 30 points and a career-high 17 rebounds in a 138–131 double overtime win against the San Antonio Spurs.

National team career
Duren played for United States at the 2019 FIBA Under-16 Americas Championship in Belém, Brazil. He averaged 10.3 points, 8.2 rebounds and two blocks per game en route to a gold medal and a spot on the tournament all-star five team.

Career statistics

College

|-
| style="text-align:left;"|2021–22
| style="text-align:left;"|Memphis
| 29 || 29 || 25.3 || .597 || .000 || .625 || 8.1 || 1.3 || .8 || 2.1 || 12.0

Player profile
Duren is widely considered the best "true post" player in his class by recruiting sites and sportswriters alike. He wields influence in the paint due to his size, strength, athleticism and footwork that allows him to dominate on both sides of the floor. Jake Weingarten, founder of recruiting site StockRisers.com, described him as NBA-ready as a tenth grader amid reports that the NBA was considering lowering the minimum draft age from 19 to 18.

His physically imposing frame and shot-blocking talent drew comparisons to Bam Adebayo from 247Sports national basketball director Eric Bossi, while his AAU coach Chris Rountree likened him to Marvin Bagley III.

References

External links
 Memphis Tigers bio
 Montverde Academy Eagles bio
 USA Basketball bio

2003 births
Living people
21st-century African-American sportspeople
African-American basketball players
American men's basketball players
Basketball players from Delaware
Centers (basketball)
Charlotte Hornets draft picks
Detroit Pistons players
Memphis Tigers men's basketball players
People from New Castle, Delaware